Amanita chlorinosma, also known as the chlorine amanita, is a species of Amanita from Massachusetts and Illinois south to Florida in Pine and Oak forest.

References

External links
 
 

chlorinosma
Taxa named by Charles Horton Peck